The Heidelberg Tavern massacre occurred in Observatory, Cape Town on 30 December 1993. Three Azanian People's Liberation Army (APLA) terrorists entered the Heidelberg Tavern and opened fire on the crowd, killing four students and the owner of an adjacent restaurant who went outside to investigate the sounds of gunfire. An unexploded bomb (with nails strapped to it) was found in the restaurant, close to the main entrance.

Massacre
During the years of apartheid, Observatory was one of the few de facto "grey" suburbs where all races lived together. On the evening of 30 December 1993, three men entered a popular student venue on Station Road, called the Heidelberg Tavern and opened fire, killing four people and injuring five. The three APLA operatives – Humphrey Luyanda Gqomfa, Vuyisile Brian Madasi and Zola Prince Mabala – were convicted in November 1994 for what became known as the Heidelberg Massacre. On 16 July 1998, the Truth and Reconciliation Commission granted the three amnesty.

Victims
Killed:

Bernadette Sharon Langford

Lindy-Anne Fourie

Rolande Lucielle Palm 

Nosolino Cequeira

Injured:

Benjamin Joseph Broude

Quintin Cornelius

Dave Deglon

Justin Julian Fouche

Michael January

See also
List of massacres in South Africa

References

Conflicts in 1993
1993 in South Africa
Mass murder in 1993
December 1993 events in Africa
December 1993 crimes
Massacres in 1993
Events associated with apartheid
Terrorist incidents in South Africa
Terrorist incidents in South Africa in the 1990s
Terrorist incidents in Africa in 1993
Azanian People's Liberation Army
1993 murders in South Africa
Attacks on restaurants in Africa
Attacks on bars
Student massacres
1990s massacres in South Africa
Observatory, Cape Town